Nehemiah 7 is the seventh chapter of the Book of Nehemiah in the Old Testament of the Christian Bible, or the 17th chapter of the book of Ezra-Nehemiah in the Hebrew Bible, which treats the book of Ezra and the book of Nehemiah as one book. Jewish tradition states that Ezra is the author of Ezra-Nehemiah as well as the Book of Chronicles, but modern scholars generally accept that a compiler from the 5th century BCE (the so-called "Chronicler") is the final author of these books. This chapter records the joint appointments of Hanani and Hananiah over Jerusalem and the second appearance of the Golah ("exiles") list, that is, the list of the first returning group of Jews from Babylon, which was documented earlier in Ezra 2 with few variations.

Text
The original text of this chapter is in  Hebrew language. This chapter is divided into 73 verses.

Textual witnesses
Some early manuscripts containing the text of this chapter in Hebrew are of the Masoretic Text, which includes Codex Leningradensis (1008).

There is also a translation into Koine Greek known as the Septuagint, made in the last few centuries BCE. Extant ancient manuscripts of the Septuagint version include Codex Vaticanus (B; B; 4th century), Codex Sinaiticus (S; BHK: S; 4th century), and Codex Alexandrinus (A; A; 5th century).

An ancient Greek book called 1 Esdras containing some parts of 2 Chronicles, Ezra and Nehemiah  is included in most editions of the Septuagint and is placed before the single book of Ezra–Nehemiah (which is titled in Greek). 1 Esdras 9:37-55 is an equivalent of Nehemiah 7:73-8:12 (The reading of the Law).

Vigilance (7:1–3)
The wall around Jerusalem was not the ultimate security but 'a necessary defense and dynamic distinctive symbol' of the Jews among the surrounding nations, so the inhabitants have to participate in the system to protect the city.

Verses 1–2
 Now when the wall had been built and I had set up the doors, and the gatekeepers, the singers, and the Levites had been appointed,   I gave my brother Hanani and Hananiah the governor of the castle charge over Jerusalem, for he was a more faithful and God-fearing man than many.
"Castle": "citadel" (NKJV) or "palace" (KJV).

Verse 4
Now the city was large and spacious, but the people in it were few, and the houses were not rebuilt.
The Revised Standard Version reads ... no houses had been built, the Revised Version, the houses were not builded. H. E. Ryle counsels against a literal interpretation of these words, suggesting that the real meaning was that there were large open spaces within the walls where more houses could be built.

The census (7:4–73)
The defensive measures implemented by Nehemiah, Hanani and Hananiah were only for short-term, because the bigger goal was to reestablish Jerusalem as the center of Jewish culture and religious purity, so it has to be repopulated from some people who then lived outside the city. Nehemiah was looking for Jews with veriable heritage to send some family members to populate Jerusalem, but instead of starting a census, he used the original listing of those who had been the first to return which specified clan origins. This list is almost an exact replication of the one in Ezra 2, with slight variations likely due to the transcribing and transmission over time.

Verse 7
Who came with Zerubbabel, Jeshua, Nehemiah, Azariah, Raamiah, Nahamani, Mordecai, Bilshan, Mispereth, Bigvai, Nehum, Baanah. The number, I say, of the men of the people of Israel was this;

"Zerubbabel": is the leader of the group and of Davidic line, so he is associated with the messianic hope in the book of Zechariah, although none of it is mentioned in this book. His office is not named in this book, but he is identified as the "governor of Judah" in Haggai 1:1, ; .
"Jeshua": or "Joshua". His office is not named in this book, but he is identified as the "high priest" in Haggai 1:1, ; ; .
Some names are written differently in the book of Ezra (2:2):

See also
Jerusalem
Nebuchadnezzar II
Related Bible parts: Ezra 2, Nehemiah 1

Notes

References

Sources

Further reading
Blenkinsopp, Joseph, "Ezra-Nehemiah: A Commentary" (Eerdmans, 1988)
Blenkinsopp, Joseph, "Judaism, the first phase" (Eerdmans, 2009)
Coggins, R.J., "The Books of Ezra and Nehemiah" (Cambridge University Press, 1976)
Ecker, Ronald L., "Ezra and Nehemiah", Ecker's Biblical Web Pages, 2007.
Grabbe, L.L., "Ezra-Nehemiah" (Routledge, 1998)
Grabbe, L.L., "A history of the Jews and Judaism in the Second Temple Period, Volume 1" (T&T Clark, 2004)
Throntveit, Mark A. (1992) "Ezra-Nehemiah". John Knox Press

External links
 Jewish translations:
 Nechemiah - Nehemiah - Chapter 7 (Judaica Press) translation [with Rashi's commentary] at Chabad.org
 Christian translations:
 Online Bible at GospelHall.org (ESV, KJV, Darby, American Standard Version, Bible in Basic English)
 Book of Nehemiah Chapter 7. Bible Gateway

07